Ulyun is a rural locality (an ulus) in Barguzinsky District, Republic of Buryatia, Russia. The population was 1,061 as of 2010. There are 18 streets.

Geography 
Ulyun is located 32 km northeast of Barguzin (the district's administrative centre) by road. Ulyukchikan is the nearest rural locality.

References 

Rural localities in Barguzinsky District